Nazmun Ara Sultana (born July 8, 1950) first woman in Bangladesh to serve as head of an Appellate Division bench in Supreme Court. Supreme Court, the apex court that gives a final verdict in the country's judicial system. Nazmun Ara Sultana took oath as a first female justice of Appellate Division on February 23 in 2011. She goes into retirement on July 7, 2017.

Early life and education
Nazmun was born in Moulvibazar in 1950. Her father was Abul Kashem Moinuddin. Her mother is Begum Rashida Sultana Din. She lost her father at the age of 11. She passed SSC exam from Vidyamoyee Govt. Girls' High School in 1965 and HSC exam from Muminunnesa Women's College in 1967. Sultana graduated from Ananda Mohan College. After that she complete her LLB from Momenshahi Law college, Maymenshing.

Career
Nazmun Ara Sultana joined the Judicial Service as a Munsif on December 20, 1975, and promoted as District and Sessions Judge on December 20, 1990. She passed Bangladesh Civil Service (BCS) and joined as sub judge on 1975. She was appointed as additional justice in High Court on May 28 in 2000. Later She was appointed as permanent judge. Justice Nazmun is the founding president of Bangladesh Women Judges Association (BWJA). She is also an active member of International Association of Women Judges (IAWJ) since its formation. She was selected as Secretary of IAWJ for 2 consecutive terms of 4 years.

Personal life
Sultana is married to Kazi Nurul Hoque. They have two sons, Kazi Sanaul Hoque Upol and Ehsanul Hoque Surzo.

References

1955 births
Living people
Bangladeshi women judges
People from Moulvibazar Sadar Upazila